Talitropsis is a genus of cave wētā in the family Rhaphidophoridae, endemic to New Zealand, and containing six described species. Two Talitropsis species are found only on the Chatham Islands.

Species 
 Talitropsis chopardi (Karny, 1937) 
 Talitropsis crassicruris Hutton, 1897 
 Talitropsis irregularis Hutton, 1897  
 Talitropsis megatibia Trewick, 1999
 Talitropsis poduroides (Walker, 1871) 
 Talitropsis sedilloti Bolivar, 1883

References 

 Peripatus
 Royal Society of New Zealand

Ensifera genera
Cave weta
Taxa named by Ignacio Bolívar